José Francisco de Almeida Pacheco (born 1951) is a Portuguese educator who pioneered a school called Escola da Ponte (Bridge School), in Vila das Aves, Portugal. He is also a published writer, with some books and a wide range of articles.

Biography
Specialist in Music and Literacy, he holds a master's degree in Science of Education by the School of Psychology and Education of the University of Porto (Universidade do Porto).

Pacheco was the principal of Escola da Ponte since 1976, which was founded by him. The school has international prestige for its innovation and good inclusive practices. Pacheco is the author of several books and articles on Educational practice.

He has been living in Brazil for the last ten years, attracted by the bigger innovative movement in the area of education and schooling.

Award
2004: In May  was awarded by the President of Portugal Jorge Sampaio with the Ordem da Instrução Pública, which is one of the honorific orders of Portugal. This is the attribution of decoration to individuals personal bravery, achievement, or service to Portugal.

Books
PACHECO, José. (2000) Quando eu for grande, quero ir à Primavera. Ed. Didática Suplegraf.
PACHECO, José. (2003) Sózinhos na Escola. Ed. Didática Suplegraf.
PACHECO, José. (2006) Caminhos para a Inclusão, Artmed Editora.

References

External links
 A new education is possible, Written by Maria Occarina Macedo, May 30, 2012
 Our Schools Are Always Open, by Leila Dregger, Aug 15, 2014
 Brazil's ‘Silent Revolution’ in Education, Inspired by Portugal, Written by Paula Góes,  8 January 2014
 What have you done today to change the world? A different learning method, by Cláudia Gomes Oliveira, Van Der Love, April 10, 2018
 Projeto Âncora

Portuguese male writers
1951 births
Living people
Portuguese educators
University of Porto alumni
20th-century Portuguese educators
21st-century Portuguese educators